Oleksandr Borysovych Sytnyk (born 2 January 1985) is a Ukrainian former professional football defender.

See also
 2005 FIFA World Youth Championship squads#Ukraine

External links
Profile on Official Illichivets Website
Profile on EUFO
Profile on Football Squads
 
 

1985 births
Living people
Footballers from Vinnytsia
Ukrainian footballers
Ukraine youth international footballers
Ukraine under-21 international footballers
Ukrainian Premier League players
Ukrainian First League players
Ukrainian Second League players
Russian First League players
FC Dynamo Kyiv players
FC Dynamo-2 Kyiv players
FC Dynamo-3 Kyiv players
FC Borysfen-2 Boryspil players
FC Karpaty Lviv players
FC Mariupol players
FC Kharkiv players
FC Arsenal Kyiv players
FC Zirka Kropyvnytskyi players
FC Zvezda Irkutsk players
FC Hoverla Uzhhorod players
FC Dinaz Vyshhorod players
Ukrainian expatriate footballers
Expatriate footballers in Russia
Ukrainian expatriate sportspeople in Russia
Association football midfielders